A Neapolitan Spell is a 2002 Italian comedy film written and directed by Paolo Genovese and Luca Miniero, at their feature film debut.

For her performance in this film, Marina Confalone won the David di Donatello for Best Actress.

Plot 
Little Assuntina, born into a Neapolitan family, as she grows up begins to speak with a strict Milanese dialect. This very strange anomaly throws the relatives into despair. Over the years, despite attempts to correct it, Assuntina with her language will worsen further, so much so that she will be given the nickname of "Cotoletta" and will refuse to adapt to any Neapolitan tradition, also refusing the typical sweets of the city for those of the capital Lombard.

All further attempts by family and friends will be in vain, as will the long stay that they will make her do in Torre Annunziata to let her study the true Neapolitan language with her uncles, commoners who speak only in a very narrow dialect.

When she reaches twenty, Assuntina becomes pregnant.

Cast 
 
 Gianni Ferreri as Gianni Aiello
 Marina Confalone as Patrizia Aiello
 Clelia Bernacchi as Assunta (old age)
 Serena Improta as  Assunta (20 years old)
 Chiara Papa as Assunta (10 years old)
 Riccardo Zinna as  Riccardo
 Lello Giulivo as  Ciro
 Lucianna De Falco as  Renata 
 Ciro Ruoppo as  Don Alfonso

See also  
 List of Italian films of 2005

References

External links

2005 films
2005 comedy films
Films directed by Paolo Genovese
Films directed by Luca Miniero
Italian comedy films
2005 directorial debut films
2000s Italian-language films